John Parish (born 11 April 1959) is an English musician, songwriter, composer and record producer.

Parish is best known for his work with singer-songwriter PJ Harvey. He has also worked with such artists as Eels, Aldous Harding, Tracy Chapman, Giant Sand, and Sparklehorse. His sister is the actor Sarah Parish. Parish was born in Yeovil, Somerset and lives in Bristol. In 1980s, his girlfriend was Maria Mochnacz.

Career
His first record release was a single "Mind Made" by the British new wave band, Thieves Like Us (1980). In 1982, he formed the band Automatic Dlamini, with Rob Ellis. The changing line-up of Automatic Dlamini included Polly Harvey from 1988 until 1991. Automatic Dlamini recorded three albums: The D is For Drum (1987), Here Catch Shouted his Father (1990 – unreleased but available as a bootleg), and From A Diva to a Diver (1992). By the time From A Diva to a Diver was released, Harvey had left to form the PJ Harvey trio with ex-Dlamini members Rob Ellis and Ian Olliver, and Parish was playing guitar with Marc Moreland's band The Ensenada Joyride.

In 1986 Parish had begun a parallel career as a record producer working with UK bands including The Chesterfields, The Brilliant Corners, The Caretaker Race and The Becketts. In 1995 he co-produced PJ Harvey's "To Bring You My Love", on which he also played guitar, drums, percussion and organ. He co-wrote and produced The Eels album Souljacker (2001), and played guitar on the world tour that accompanied its release. He has produced and/or played on a number of Howe Gelb / Giant Sand albums and frequently appears onstage with them. Parish produced the Giant Sand album Chore of Enchantment (2000), and a photograph of his wedding in Tucson in 1998 was used as the cover for the 2011 re-release of the record.

He also began working as a film composer in 1998, writing the score for Belgian director Patrice Toye's debut film, Rosie. Parish's score won the Jury Special Appreciation prize at the 1999 Bonn Film & TV Music Biennale. He has since scored another ten soundtracks.

Parish has now worked on seven albums with Harvey, including two co-written albums: Dance Hall at Louse Point (1996) and A Woman A Man Walked By (2009). He played in the PJ Harvey touring band (guitar/drums/keyboards) from 1994–1999, from 2009–2012 and from 2015–2017. He co-produced and played on To Bring You My Love (1995), White Chalk (2007), the Mercury Prize winning Let England Shake (2011) and The Hope Six Demolition Project (2016). 

He has produced and played on two albums by New Zealand singer-songwriter Aldous Harding, two This Is the Kit albums and two albums by Malian artist Rokia Traoré. He has also collaborated several times with two established European stars, the Italian singer  Nada and Belgian singer  Arno.

Partial discography

Solo
Rosie  (2000)
How Animals Move (2002)
Once Upon a Little Time (2005)
She, A Chinese Original Soundtrack (2010)
Screenplay (2013)
Bird Dog Dante (2018)

Scores
 Rosie (1998 film) dir. Patrice Toye (1998)
Water dir. Jennifer Houlton (2004)
Waltz (2006) dir. Norbert Ter
Nowhere Man dir. Patrice Toye (2008)
Going South   dir. Sébastien Lifshitz (2009)
She, A Chinese dir. Xiaolu Guo(2010)
Little Black Spiders dir. Patrice Toye (2012)
Tench dir. Patrice Toye  (2019)
Sister dir. Ursula Meier (2012)
The Farmer's Wife dir. Francis Lee (director) (2012)
Le Passé Devant Nous dir. Nathalie Teirlinck (2016)

Collaborations
 John Parish & Polly Jean Harvey – Dance Hall at Louse Point (1996): Writer, Producer, Various Instruments
 Spleen – Soundtrack To Spleen (1997): Co-writer, guitar, percussion
 Spleen – Little Scratches (1998): Co-writer, guitar, percussion
 Eels – Souljacker (2001): Producer, co-writer, various instruments
 PJ Harvey & John Parish – A Woman a Man Walked By (2009): Writer, producer, various instruments
 Playing Carver (2014): Producer, guitar, vocals
 Eels – Extreme Witchcraft (2022): Producer, co-writer, various instruments

Productions
 PJ Harvey – To Bring You My Love (1995): Producer, Guitar, Organ, Percussion, Drums
 16 Horsepower – Low Estate (1997): Producer, Various Instruments
 Giant Sand – Chore of Enchantment (2000): Producer
 Bettie Serveert – Private Suit (2000) : Producer
 Thou – Put Us in Tune (2000): Producer, mix
 Dominique A – Auguri (2001): Producer, various instruments
 Morning Star – My Place in The Dust (2001): Producer
 Sparklehorse – It's a Wonderful Life (2001): Co-Producer, Various Instruments
 Tracy Chapman – Let it Rain (2002): Producer
 Thou – I like Girls in Russia (2004): Producer
 Morning Star – The Opposite is True (2004): Producer
 Jennie DeVoe – Fireworks and Karate Supplies (2004): Producer
 Nada – Tutto l'amore che mi manca (2004): Producer
 Afterhours – Ballate per piccole iene (2005): Producer e guitar on Ballata per la mia piccola iena
 Dionysos – Monsters in Love (2005): Producer
 PJ Harvey – White Chalk (2007): Producer
 Tom Brosseau – Cavalier (2007): Producer
 Magic Rays – Off the Map (2007) : Producer
 Marta Collica – Pretty and Unsafe (2007) : Producer
 Afterhours – I Milanesi Ammazzano il sabato (14 ricette di quotidiana macabra felicità) (2008): Producer
 Jennie DeVoe- Strange Sunshine(2009):  Producer
 This Is The Kit – Krulle Bol (2008): Producer, drums
 Cesare Basile – Storia di Caino (2008): Producer, guitar.
 Marta Collica – About Anything (2009): Producer
 Maika Makovski – Maika Makovski (2010): Producer, guitar, drums, bass, banjo
 Kira – Look Up Ahead (2010): Producer
 Zender – Sunday Kids (2010): Mix
 Nive Nielsen and The Deer Children – Nive Sings (2010): Producer, drums, guitar, bongos
 Peggy Sue – Acrobats (2011): Producer
 PJ Harvey – Let England Shake (2011): Producer, guitar, drums, vocals, keyboards, trombone
 Arno – Future Vintage (2012): Producer, guitars, drums
 KT Tunstall – Invisible Empire // Crescent Moon (2013): Mix
 Jay Diggins – Searching (2013): Co-Producer with Jay Diggins, various instruments
 Mazgani – Common ground (2013): Co-Producer with Mick Harvey, various instruments
 Jenny Hval – Innocence is Kinky (2013): Producer, guitar, drums, variophon
 Rokia Traoré – Beautiful Africa (2013): Producer
 Jennie DeVoe – Radiator: The Bristol Sessions (2014): Producer
 Arno –Human Incognito (2016): Producer
 PJ Harvey – The Hope Six Demolition Project (2016): Co-Producer, various instruments, backing vocals
 Rokia Traoré - Ne so (2016): Producer
 Nadine Khouri  – The Salted Air (2017): Producer, various instruments, backing vocals
 Aldous Harding – Party (2017): Producer
 This Is the Kit - Moonshine Freeze (2017): Producer
 Nada – È un momento difficile, tesoro (2019): Producer, Various Instruments
 Aldous Harding – Designer (2019): Producer
 Jesca Hoop - Stonechild (2019)
 Arno - Santeboutique (2020)
 Dry Cleaning - New Long Leg (2021)
 The Goon Sax - Mirror II (2021)
 Aldous Harding – Warm Chris (2022): Producer, Various Instruments
 Dry Cleaning - Stumpwork (2022)

Featured musician on
 PJ Harvey – Is This Desire? (1998): Various Instruments
 Goldfrapp – Felt Mountain (2000) : guitar, drums
 M. Ward – Transistor Radio (2005) : drums
 M. Ward – Primitive Girl on A Wasteland Companion (2012): drums, percussion
 Perfume Genius - "Too Bright" (2014): drums

References

External links
Official website
Cat On The Wall Interview
June 2009 Interview with L.A. Record
PJ Harvey and John Parish interview with The Guardian writer John Harris

1959 births
Living people
People from Yeovil
Musicians from Bristol
Eels (band) members
British record producers
English record producers
English rock guitarists
English multi-instrumentalists
People educated at Yeovil School